Elly Is Cinderella is Seo In-Young's 2nd studio single album. It was released on July 23, 2008.

Track listing
신데렐라 (Cinderella)
I Like It ft. Crown J
Too Much (club Remix Version) 
신데렐라 (Hip Hop Version) (Cinderella Hip Hop Version)
I Like It (feat. Crown J.) Instrumental 
신데렐라 (Instrumental)

2008 albums